is a railway station in the town of Agematsu, Nagano Prefecture, Japan, operated by Central Japan Railway Company (JR Tōkai).

Lines

Layout
The station has one side platform and one island platform connected by a footbridge. The station is staffed.

Platforms

Adjacent stations

|-
!colspan=5|

History
Agematsu Station was opened on 5 October 1910. The current station building was completed in 1951.  On 1 April 1987, it became part of JR Tōkai.

Passenger statistics
In fiscal 2015, the station was used by an average of 189 passengers daily (boarding passengers only).

Surrounding area
Agematsu Town Hall
Agematsu-juku

See also

 List of Railway Stations in Japan

References

Railway stations in Japan opened in 1910
Railway stations in Nagano Prefecture
Stations of Central Japan Railway Company
Chūō Main Line
Agematsu, Nagano